Roman Martõnenko (born in 1977 in Tallinn) is an Estonian former competitive figure skater. He is a three-time Estonian national champion and reached the free skate at three ISU Championships – 1993 Junior Worlds in Seoul, 1997 Europeans in Paris, and 1997 Junior Worlds in Seoul.

After retiring from competition, Martõnenko performed with the Russian Ice Stars. As of 2016, he is a coach at Asker kunstløpklubb in Asker, Norway.

Competitive highlights

References 

1977 births
Estonian male single skaters
Living people
Figure skaters from Tallinn